Doña Bárbara is a 1998 Argentine-Spanish romantic drama film directed by Betty Kaplan adapted from the 1929 novel Doña Bárbara by Venezuelan author Rómulo Gallegos. The film stars Esther Goris in the title role of a wealthy, embittered female land owner who clashes with a male neighbor, portrayed by Jorge Perugorría.

Other versions
Doña Bárbara was first adapted into an acclaimed 1943 Mexican film starring María Félix as well as a 1975 Venezuelan telenovela.

External links
 
 

1998 films
1998 romantic drama films
Argentine drama films
Films directed by Betty Kaplan
Spanish drama films
1990s Spanish-language films
1990s Argentine films